Oil India Limited (OIL) is a central public sector undertaking under the ownership of the Ministry of Petroleum and Natural Gas, Government of India. The Ministry of Petroleum and Natural Gas oversees its operations, with its headquarters in Duliajan, Assam. The central public sector undertaking is a Navratna with its offices in Duliajan, Noida, Guwahati and Jodhpur.

OIL is engaged in the business of exploration, development and production of crude oil and natural gas, transportation of crude oil and production of liquid petroleum gas. The company's history spans the discovery of crude oil in India in the year 1889, this was second in the World in the far east of India at Digboi and Naharkatiya, Assam to its present status as a fully integrated upstream petroleum company presently operating in more than 9 locations overseas. Recently, OIL acquired majority shares in Numaligarh Refinery Limited from Bharat Petroleum Corporation Limited, thus making Numaligarh Refinery Limited a subsidiary of OIL.

Exploration and production
Oil India Limited was formed by the Burmah Oil Company Limited as its subsidiary in India 1887 to explore in the Assam Basin, India (Corley, T A B, 1983, The History of the Burmah Oil Company, 1886–1983). Staff at the Burmah Oil Company Limited had heard from a geologist with the colonial British Indian Geological Survey, Thomas Oldham, that oil was found on the feet of elephants that were being used as beasts of burden in the vicinity of the Digboi village (Arun Metrie, pers. comm., former Burmah Oil economist, 1988). The oil on the elephants' feet was traced to the Digboi area, where a surface fold (anticline in geological parlance) had formed a broad hill. A successful technique for exploration for hydrocarbons at the time was drilling beneath seeps on anticlines (Thornton, S E, 2015, The history of Oil Exploration in the Union of Myanmar, Paper No. 10807), so Oil India drilled beneath the Digboi seeps and found a giant oil field. Several other oil fields were subsequently found by Oil India Limited in what became India's first oil production.

Recoverable oil reserves.  the company produced 3.466 MMT of crude oil, 2625.81 million cubic metre at standard conditions of natural gas and 46,640 tonnes of LPG. Most of this was produced from its traditionally rich oil and gas fields concentrated in the Northeastern part of India and contribute around 80% of total oil and gas produced in the region. The search for newer avenues has seen OIL spreading out its operations in onshore / offshore Orissa and Andaman, Cauvery offshore, Tamil Nadu, Arabian Sea, deserts of Rajasthan, onshore Andhra Pradesh, riverbeds of Brahmaputra and logistically difficult hilly terrains of the Indian state Mizoram and Arunachal Pradesh. In Rajasthan, OIL discovered gas in 1988, heavy oil / bitumen in 1991 and started production of gas in 1996. The company has accumulated over a hundred years of experience in the field of oil and gas production, since the discovery of Digboi oilfield in 1889.

It has emerged as a consistently profitable International company and present in Libya, Gabon, Nigeria, Sudan, Venezuela, Mozambique, Yemen, Iran, Bangladesh and United States. OIL has recently emerged in the offshore giant gas-field project of Mozambique and also made discovery of oil & gas in Gabon as an Operator and Libya as non-operator. OIL acquired Shale oil asset in United States during 2012.
 
In recent years, Oil India Limited has stepped up exploration and production activities significantly in north-eastern India. OIL has set up its NEF (North East Frontier) project to intensify its exploration activities in the frontier areas in North East, which are logistically very difficult and geologically complex. Presently, exploration activities are in progress along the Trust Belt areas of Arunachal, Assam including Mizoram. The company operates a crude oil pipeline from Duliajan to Barauni, in Bihar.

History
Oil India was founded on 18 February 1959, with its registered office in Duliajan, Assam, as a privately held oil exploration company. Burmah Oil Company originally held two-thirds of the stock and the Government of India (via the Office of the President) held the rest. This joint venture gave birth to the exploration and drilling at two new sites in Naharkatiya and Moran in Dibrugarh district which had then been just recently discovered. In the Spring of 1961 the company became publicly listed, and later that year the Government of India acquired 50% ownership interest. In 1981, the Government of India acquired 100% of the equity interest in the company which by then controlled all the oilfields of Tinsukia and Dibrugarh districts.

In 1961, construction of the company's first gas-powered power plant was completed in Duliajan, Assam. IN 1962, a 401 km (16-inch diameter) pipeline from Duliajan to Guwahati was completed. The following year, a 756 km (14-inch diameter) extension to the pipeline from Guwahati to Barauni in Bihar was completed.

Commissioned in 1962, the double skinned crude oil pipeline traverses 78 rivers including the Brahmaputra River as it meanders through paddy fields, forests and swamps. There are 11 pumping stations, 18 repeater stations and two terminals at Numaligarh and Rongapani in Udalguri district. The engines that drive the giant pumps along the pipeline have more than two hundred thousand hours of service and established a world record of machine hours.

OIL completed the construction of a  pipeline from Numaligarh to Siliguri in November 2007. The company also sells its gas to different customers in Assam: Brahmaputra Valley Fertilizer Corporation Limited (BVFCL), ASEB, NEEPCO, Indian Oil Corporation's retail Assam Oil Division, and APL as well as to the Rajasthan Rajya Vidyut Utpadan Nigam formerly part of the Rajasthan State Electricity Board. It also produces liquefied petroleum gas (LPG) at its plant in Duliajan, Assam.

Management 

Chairman and Managing Directors
1992 to 1995 - Mr. Bikash Chandra Bora
 May 2002 to 28 February 2006 - Mr. Ranjit Kumar Dutta
14 March 2006 to 1 December 2008 - Mr. Mulkh Raj Pasrija
1 December 2008 to April 2012 - Mr. Nayan Mani Borah
 May 2012 to 30 June 2015 - Mr. S. K. Srivastava
1 July 2015 to 17 July 2016 - vacant
18 July 2016 to 30 September 2019 -  Mr. Utpal Bora
1 October 2019 to 30 June 2022- Mr. Sushil Chandra Mishra
2 August 2022 to present - Mr. Ranjit Rath

International operations 
OIL's overseas E & P portfolio consists of 17 Blocks spread over 10 countries: Libya, Gabon, Nigeria, Yemen, Venezuela, USA, Mozambique, Myanmar, Bangladesh and Russia.  In addition to the above, OIL has 10% PI in 741 km long Multiproduct pipeline construction and operation project in Sudan which was completed in 2005.

Subsidiaries

Oil India Limited carries out operations through a total of five subsidiaries, namely OIIL (Oil Indian International Limited), Oil India International BV, Oil India Sweden AB, Oil Indian (USA) Inc and OIL Cyprus.

During 2016-17

OIL along with Indian Consortium partners IOCL and BPRL acquired two producing assets in Russia - 23.9% stake in Vankorneft, Russia and 29.9% stake in Taas-Yuryakh, Russia .  These assets are held through OIL's WOS Oil India International Pte. Ltd. incorporated in Singapore.

TYNGD is a producing asset with current production of 1.13 MMT and expected peak production of 5 MMT by 2021.  It is one of the largest green fields located in Eastern Siberia. TYNGD is ramping up required infrastructure to meet peak production level.

Vankorneft has two licences - Vankor and North Vankor. It is a giant oil & gas producing field located in Eastern Siberia, and contributes to about 10% of Rosneft's entire oil production. The commercial agreements for sale of oil and gas are in place for the asset. Vankorneft started commercial production from 2009 and all infrastructure is in place.

In License-61 in Russia, the development and production activities are undergoing at present. OIL is taking an active role in the development activities and supporting the operator of the license, M/s Petroneft Resources by providing expert opinions in selected areas.

In Venezuela, Carabobo Project where OIL has PI of 3.5%, the development activities in the field are under progress.

In the USA Liquid rich shale asset where OIL has 20% PI, OIL holds approx. 14172.75 net acres of the asset.

OIL together with OVL, has 10 per cent participating interest (OIL 4%, OVL 6%) in the Mozambique block in the Area 1 Rovuma Field. , the Initial development of Integrated Golfino-Atum (GA) Project. . The Area 1 JV is presently working on Four (4) elements, viz. (i) Legal and Contractual framework, (ii) Resettlement of the local community, (iii) Marketing of LNG, (iv) Project Financing, that must be sufficiently progressed before Operator Anadarko and the participants can determine economic viability and take Final Investment decision. The first production and revenue from the field is expected to be generated in fiscal year 2022/2023.

In Libya, in the block Area 95/96,OIL holds 25% PI and Sonatrach is the operator. The consortium signed an Interim Arrangement Agreement to continue in the block till May 2018.

In Gabon, Block SHAKTHI, a discovery has been made, which produced oil with gas.

In Nigeria, Based on the interpreted results, consortium decided to re-enter the (Discovery Well) and re-entry in the well is under progress now.

In Bangladesh, seismic acquisition and processing of acquired data is almost complete.

In Myanmar, the Consortium led by OIL has completed Geoscientific Studies.

OIL's overseas portfolio has contributed significantly to accretion of reserves and production of oil and Natural gas. During 2016–17, OIL's Crude Oil and Natural Gas Production for its proportionate share of stakes in the overseas producing assets stood at 0.9069 MMT and 352.99 million cubic metre at standard conditions respectively.

Association football team

See also
 Rajiv Gandhi Institute of Petroleum Technology

References

External links
 

Energy companies established in 1959
Non-renewable resource companies established in 1959
1959 establishments in Uttar Pradesh
Oil and gas companies of India
Government-owned companies of India
Burmah-Castrol
Companies based in Assam
Energy in Assam
Companies nationalised by the Government of India
India
1959 establishments in Assam
Companies listed on the National Stock Exchange of India
Companies listed on the Bombay Stock Exchange